Aviation in Pennsylvania dates back over 100 years. Pennsylvania ranks 11th in the country in the number of public-use aviation facilities with 122 airports, heliports, and seaplane bases. The 122 public-use facilities provide an annual economic impact of $23.6 billion to the state. The aviation industry also supports more than 300,000 jobs making it one of the largest employment sectors in the state.

The state has multiple major international airports that connect the state and surrounding areas. Philadelphia International Airport and Pittsburgh International Airport account for a majority of passenger numbers, including about three million international travelers to Europe and the Middle East.

History 

Aviation in the Commonwealth of Pennsylvania dates back over 100 years. The state has been at the forefront of aviation development and growth. In the early 1900s, the state was home to substantial growth.

Industry beginnings 
After the Wright brothers' first flight in 1903, the opportunity of flight raced across the nation. Inventors began working on designs for their own flying machines and held public air shows to show them off. Many of the state's airports were founded in the 1910s and 1920s, and the aviation industry was brought forward.

Piper Aviation 
The Piper Aircraft Corporation was formed in the 1930s when William T. Piper purchased the Taylor Aircraft Company, rebranded, and relocated operations to Lock Haven. Piper Aircraft became world-renowned for its production of the J-3 Cub and as the leading producer of general aviation aircraft at the time.

WWII

During World War II, Pennsylvania was designated by the United States Army and United States Air Force as training skies for bomber and fighter pilots before deployment to Europe or Asia. These bases include Fort Indiantown Gap, Pittsburgh Air Reserve Station and Harrisburg International Airport. The Air Force also built bombers throughout the state.

Modern commercial aviation 

As jet travel became more popular, airline choices expanded as well. The state's airports saw record numbers during the 1960s and 1970s, especially at Philadelphia International Airport, the largest and the gateway to Europe, and Pittsburgh International Airport, a then-hub for US Airways and a primarily domestic airport with some flights to Canada and Latin America. All airports saw a dramatic rise in flights and passengers in the 1970s, 1980s, and 1990s; however, after the September 11th attacks, Pennsylvania's airports, much like the rest of the country, saw huge declines in passenger numbers. This caused airlines to withdraw, such as British Airways in Pittsburgh and KLM at Philadelphia's airport.

Continued growth and industry expansion 

Many airports in the commonwealth have seen recent growth. In turn, facilities and infrastructure is being updated or constructed. Since 2011 the FAA along with local, state, and Federal governments allotted almost $1 billion to aviation infrastructure at the state's airports, most predominantly at Philadelphia International Airport, Wilkes-Barre/Scranton International Airport and Williamsport Regional Airport.

Major airports 
Major airports in Pennsylvania with over 25,000 reported passengers.

Notable aviation companies 

The following are notable aviation manufacturers, suppliers, and airlines based in Pennsylvania.
 Air East — commuter airline
 Altair Airlines — now defunct airline
 Boeing Rotorcraft Systems — headquarters and main factory near Philadelphia
 Fly Advanced — charter airline
 Lycoming Engines — aircraft engine manufacturer
 Piper Aircraft Corporation — aircraft manufacturer since relocated to Florida 
 Sawdust Airlines — airline
 USA3000 Airlines — now defunct airline

Airliner accidents within Pennsylvania 
Click on the flight number for the accident page.

References